Toscha Seidel (November 17, 1899 – November 15, 1962) was a Russian violin virtuoso.

Biography
Seidel was born in Odessa on November 17, 1899, to a Jewish family. A student of Leopold Auer in St. Petersburg, Seidel became known for a lush, romantic tone and unique and free rubato.  In the 1930s he emigrated to the United States. Before making his way to Hollywood where he made a career in the studios of motion pictures, he had a show on CBS radio called The Toscha Seidel Program; he was also that radio network's musical director.  He was featured (as soloist) in several Hollywood  productions, including the movies Intermezzo, Melody for Three, and even The Wizard of Oz.  He was also an avid chess player (like Mischa Elman). In 1922, George Gershwin wrote a song about him and his fellow Russian-Jewish virtuoso violinists called, "Mischa, Jascha, Toscha, Sascha."

Seidel had a weekly broadcast on the CBS radio network in the 1930s.

In 1934 Seidel gave violin instruction to Albert Einstein, and received a sketch in return, reportedly diagramming length contraction of his theory of relativity.

He died on November 15, 1962.

Instruments 

Seidel performed on several well-known violins including:

 Antonio Stradivari, the "da Vinci" 1714 (now known as the Ex-Seidel), which he purchased in 1924 for $25,000 and said he wouldn't trade it for a million
 Giovanni Battista Guadagnini 1786 (now known as the Ex-Seidel)
 a copy of the "Alard Stradivari"  by Jean-Baptiste Vuillaume 1860.

Quotes
 "The boy (Jascha Heifetz) was one of those in a group of young Jewish violinists who later startled the world. The others would include Mischa Elman, Tosha Seidel, Efrem Zimbalist and Nathan Milstein." —New York Times by Harold Schonberg, Published: December 12, 1987

References

External links
 Toscha Seidel recordings at the Discography of American Historical Recordings.
 Toscha Seidel plays Intermezzo by Heinz Provost
 Toscha Seidel plays Hungarian Dance No. 5 by Johannes Brahms

1899 births
1962 deaths
Russian classical violinists
American classical violinists
American male violinists
Jewish classical musicians
Ukrainian Jews
20th-century classical violinists
20th-century American male musicians
Male classical violinists
Soviet violinists
20th-century American violinists